Fusa is a village in Bjørnafjorden municipality in Vestland county, Norway. The village was historically the administrative centre of the old municipality of Fusa which is why Fusa Church is located here, but more recently the administration was moved to the larger village of Eikelandsosen until 2020.

The large Frank Mohn factory is in Fusa, just southwest of the village centre.  The factory here is the marine division of the corporation, specializing in production of cargo pumping systems, transportable pumping system, and anti-heeling pumping systems.

References

Villages in Vestland
Bjørnafjorden